Old Lace may refer to:

Old Lace (color), a very pale yellowish orange like the color of an old lace tablecloth
Old Lace (comics), a fictional dinosaur
"Old Lace" (song), a song from 1933 by Isham Jones and Charles Newman